Emarginea is a genus of moths of the family Noctuidae. The genus was erected by Achille Guenée in 1852.<

Species
 Emarginea anna Schaus, 1911
 Emarginea combusta (Walker, [1858])
 Emarginea dulcinea Dyar, 1921 (misspelling Emarginea dulcinia)
 Emarginea empyra Dyar, 1909
 Emarginea gammophora Guenée, 1852
 Emarginea minastes Dyar, 1920
 Emarginea niphoplaga Druce, 1909
 Emarginea nocea Dyar, 1912
 Emarginea oleagina (Dognin, 1889)
 Emarginea pallida (Smith, 1902)
 Emarginea partitella (Maassen, 1890)
 Emarginea percara (Morrison, 1875)

References

Amphipyrinae